Hilbert field may refer to:

 The Hilbert field, the minimal ordered Pythagorean field
 A Hilbert field is one with minimal Kaplansky radical
 Hilbert class field, the maximal abelian unramified extension of a number field
 Hilbert–Speiser field, a field with a normal integral basis
 Hilbertian field, a field supporting a Hilbertian variety, one which is not "thin"